Nayka Dam is an earthen dam on the Bhogavo River located near Surendranagar in the Indian state of Gujarat. Nayka is a major source of water and helps with flood control.

The dam serves seven villages. One village is fully and another village partially submerged behind the dam. The reservoir covers  forest land,  wasteland,  cultivable land.

The Nayka Dam irrigated  in 1997–98.

References

Dams in Gujarat
Surendranagar district
Dams completed in 1961
1961 establishments in Gujarat
20th-century architecture in India